Talmon Marco is an Israeli-American entrepreneur, best known as the founder of H2Pro, founder and former CEO of Viber, a proprietary cross-platform instant messaging VoIP application for smartphones, and Juno, a ride sharing service.

Career
Born in Israel, Marco served as CIO for the Israeli Defense Forces Central Command. He completed a degree in Computer Science and Management from Tel-Aviv University, later moving to the U.S. where he spent most of his adult life.

In 1997 he co-founded Expand Networks and served as the company's President until 2004.

In 1998, Marco co-founded iMesh, where he was President until 2010.

In 2010 he co-founded Viber with Igor Magazinik, a friend from the Israel Defense Forces, and served as its CEO. In 2014, Rakuten acquired the company for $900,000,000.

In 2016, he founded Juno, a ride-sharing app. In 2017, Gett acquired the company for $200,000,000.

References

American business executives
American people of Israeli descent
Israeli military personnel
Living people
Israeli financial businesspeople
1973 births